The Wall of Welcome is a 120-foot-long community public art mosaic located at 7100 Woodrow Avenue in the Crestview neighborhood of Austin, Texas. First envisioned by artist and Brentwood resident Jean Graham in 2002, the Wall reflects the community and documents some of the history of the Brentwood and Crestview neighborhoods.    Fundraising for the wall began in 2003 with the first Violet Crown Festival. Jean and hundreds of neighbors worked together for five years to make the wall a reality; it was completed and dedicated in March 2008.

The 2008 short film A Community Mosaic, produced by Rob and Susan Burneson, tells the story of the creation of the Wall, along with the history and people of Brentwood and Crestview.

Barbara Lugge's book Wall of Welcome: A Neighborhood Project illustrates the wall and its individual tiles.

References

External links
Gigapan photo

Mosaics
Public art in the United States
2008 works
Buildings and structures in Austin, Texas
Murals in Texas
Tourist attractions in Austin, Texas
Culture of Austin, Texas